The American rock band Death Cab for Cutie has recorded songs for nine studio albums, as well as numerous extended plays. This list comprises the band's recorded catalog, as well as non-album singles, covers, and recorded appearances on other albums.

Songs

References

External links
 
 

Death Cab for Cutie